Celiangeli Morales Meléndez (born 2 November 1985) is a sprinter from Puerto Rico. She competed in the 200 metres at the 2015 World Championships in Athletics in Beijing without advancing from the first round.

International competitions

1Disqualified in the final

Personal bests
Outdoor
100 metres – 11.39 (0.0 m/s, Mayagüez 2014)
200 metres – 23.00 (+0.8 m/s, Rio de Janeiro 2016)

References

External links
http://www.puertoricodaytrips.com/summer-olympics-2016/
http://www.telegraph.co.uk/olympics/2016/08/16/rio-olympics-2016-day-ten-24-hours-in-24-pictures/a-detail-of-the-hand-of-celiangeli-morales-of-puerto-rico-as-she/
http://www.gettyimages.com/photos/celiangeli-morales?excludenudity=true&sort=mostpopular&mediatype=photography&phrase=celiangeli%20morales

Puerto Rican female sprinters
Living people
1985 births
Sportspeople from York, Pennsylvania
American sportspeople of Puerto Rican descent
World Athletics Championships athletes for Puerto Rico
Athletes (track and field) at the 2007 Pan American Games
Athletes (track and field) at the 2015 Pan American Games
Pan American Games competitors for Puerto Rico
Athletes (track and field) at the 2016 Summer Olympics
Olympic track and field athletes of Puerto Rico
Central American and Caribbean Games medalists in athletics